Joseph A. Kamauoha (1861 to March 26, 1886), born Joseph Aio Arthur Kamauoha was born in 1861 in Nāpoʻopoʻo, Kona, Hawaiʻi.  In 1883, the Hawaiian language newspaper Ke Koo o Hawaii, writes about three Keiki Hawaii Imi Naʻauao, three young men who travelled to London, England to study abroad.  One of these your men was named Joseph A. Kaumauoha, a former student of ʻIolani School and Punahou School during 1880-1882.  Kamauoha, along with Matthew Makalua and Abraham Piʻianaiʻa traveled to England under the care of Manley Hopkins, HIs Majesty King Kalākauaʻs Consul-General in England.

His family genealogy traces back to the time of King Kamehameha I, where one of his kūpuna (grandparent), Panila, was kahuna kālai waʻa (canoe carver) to the Naʻi Aupuni (kingdom), essentially bringing his ʻohana closer to governmental power.  Kamauoha was selected by His Majesty King Kalākaua to be a scholar in the Hawaiian Kingdom sponsored Hawaiian Youths Abroad Program.  Kamauoha attended Kingʻs College located in the heart of London near the River Thames.  In his first year of school there he studied English, Latin, French, and Math.  By the time his second year came around he was studying, Chemistry, Trigonometry and Mechanics.  He was a serious student and quite shy as Manley Hopkins indicates in his letter to Hawaii, "Kamauoha is prudent, studios and diligent; gives no ground for complaint in anyway, but rather dull in conversation; indeed speaks but little."

Kamauohaʻs quiet, humble demeanor was further highlighted in an editorial found in The Globe, a London based newspaper, entitled, "A Modest Rescuer." In the editorial, Hopkins shares a story about a young Hawaiian man who rescues two men who fell off a plank while loading a ship.  The Hawaiian man dragged the first man to the wharf and then proceeded to save the other man who fell after.  After he saved the two men this Hawaiian man "immediately lost himself in the crowd" and "it was unknown to whom the two lives saved were indebted."  Manley Hopkins reveals that this Hawaiian man, who rescued these two men, was Joseph Kamauoha.

The cold winters soon challenged his physical body that was made for a more tropical climate.  In an update letter to His Majesty, dated October, 1885, Hopkins shares that Joseph was "suffering somewhat in health.  I wrote that he had had a little trouble with one hand requiring slight operation and that a chill had occasioned an inflammation in his eye.  Since then, he has had an attack of pleurisy, not severe, but not yet entirely removed."  It seemed that after his arrival, the winter started to take a toll on his body, so Hopkins moved Joseph Kamauoha to Torquay, England.  Hopkins refers to this city as the "frying-pan of England" in his February 25, 1886 letter to His Majesty Kalākaua.  Being further away from his friends, humble and quiet Kamauoha made friends in Torquay.  Sadly, in a letter dated March 27, 1886, Hopkins, announces the death of Joseph A. Kamauoha the day before in Torquay.  He says, "Very kind friends in the boarding house at Torquay attended his bed-side, and he had every comfort.  Thus we lose a fine, promising young man of high moral character."  Iʻm sure that this was a great loss to his two friends Makalua and Piʻianaiʻa, yet it was even greater loss for all of Hawaii who considered him ka imi naʻauao (the seeker of wisdom).

References 

People from Hawaii
Alumni of King's College London

1861 births
1886 deaths